Akrasia (Greek , "lacking command" or "weakness", occasionally transliterated as acrasia or Anglicised as acrasy or acracy) is a lack of self-control, or acting against one's better judgment. Beginning with Plato, a variety of philosophers have attempted to determine whether or not akrasia exists and how to best define it.

History

In Plato's Protagoras dialogue, Socrates asks precisely how it is possible that, if one judges action A to be the best course of action, one would do anything other than A?

Classical answers
Plato's Socrates attests that akrasia does not exist, claiming "No one goes willingly toward the bad" (358d). If a person examines a situation and decides to act in the way he determines to be best, he will pursue this action, as the best course is also the good course, i.e. man's natural goal.  An all-things-considered assessment of the situation will bring full knowledge of a decision's outcome and worth linked to well-developed principles of the good. A person, according to Socrates, never chooses to act poorly or against his better judgment; and, therefore, actions that go against what is best are simply a product of being ignorant of facts or knowledge of what is best or good.

Aristotle, acknowledging that we intuitively believe in akrasia, devoted book VII of the Nicomachean Ethics to a more empirical approach to the question. He distances himself from the Socratic position by arguing that akrasia occurs as a result of an agent's opinion, not their desire. Since opinion is formulated mentally in a way that may or may not imitate truth, while appetites are merely desires of the body, opinion is only incidentally aligned with or opposed to the good, making an akratic action the product of opinion instead of reason. For Aristotle, the opposite of akrasia is enkrateia, a state where an agent has power over their desires. Aristotle considered one could be in a state of akrasia with respect to money or temper or glory, but that its core relation was to bodily enjoyment. Its causes could be weakness of will, or an impetuous refusal to think. At the same time, he did not consider it a vice, because it is not so much a product of moral choice, but instead, a failure to act on one's better knowledge.

For Augustine, incontinence was not so much a problem of knowledge (knowing but not acting) but of the will: he considered it a matter of everyday experience that men incontinently choose lesser over greater goods.

Contemporary approaches
Donald Davidson (1969–1980) attempted to answer the question by first criticizing earlier thinkers who wanted to limit the scope of akrasia to agents who despite having reached a rational decision were somehow swerved off their "desired" tracks.  Indeed, Davidson expands akrasia to include any judgment that is reached but not fulfilled, whether it be as a result of an opinion, a real or imagined good, or a moral belief. "[T]he puzzle I shall discuss depends only on the attitude or belief of the agent...my subject concerns evaluative judgments, whether they are analyzed cognitively, prescriptively, or otherwise."  Thus, he expands akrasia to include cases in which the agent seeks to fulfill desires, for example, but ends up denying himself the pleasure he has deemed most choice-worthy.

Davidson sees the problem as one of reconciling the following apparently inconsistent triad:
 If an agent believes A to be better than B, then they want to do A more than B.
 If an agent wants to do A more than B, then they will do A rather than B if they only do one.
 Sometimes an agent acts against their better judgment.

Davidson solves the problem by saying that, when people act in this way, they temporarily believe that the worse course of action is better, because they have not made an all-things-considered judgment, but only a judgment based on a subset of possible considerations.

Another contemporary philosopher, Amélie Rorty (1980) has tackled the problem by distilling out akrasia's many forms.  She contends that akrasia is manifested in different stages of the practical reasoning process. She enumerates four types of akrasia: akrasia of direction or aim, of interpretation, of irrationality, and of character.  She separates the practical reasoning process into four steps, showing the breakdown that may occur between each step and how each constitutes an akratic state.

Another explanation is that there are different forms of motivation which can conflict with each other. Throughout the ages, many have identified a conflict between reason and emotion, which might make it possible to believe that one should do A rather than B, but still end up wanting to do B more than A.

Psychologist George Ainslie argues that akrasia results from the empirically verified phenomenon of hyperbolic discounting, which causes us to make different judgements close to a reward than we will when further from it.

Weakness of will
Richard Holton (1999), argues that weakness of the will involves revising one's resolutions too easily. Under this view, it is possible to act against one's better judgment (that is, be akratic), but without being weak-willed. Suppose, for example, Sarah judges that taking revenge upon a murderer is not the best course of action, but makes the resolution to take revenge anyway and sticks to that resolution.  According to Holton, Sarah behaves akratically but does not show weakness of will.

Legacy
In the structural division of Dante's Inferno, incontinence is the sin punished in the second through fifth circles. The mutual incontinence of lust was for Dante the lightest of the deadly sins, even if its lack of self-control would open the road to deeper layers of Hell.

Akrasia appeared later as a character in Spenser's The Faerie Queene, representing the incontinence of lust, followed in the next canto by a study of that of anger; and as late as Jane Austen the sensibility of such figures as Marianne Dashwood would be treated as a form of (spiritual) incontinence.

With the triumph of Romanticism, however, the incontinent choice of feeling over reason became increasingly valorised in Western culture. Blake wrote that "those who restrain desire, do so because theirs is weak enough to be restrained". Encouraged by Rousseau, there was a rise of what Arnold J. Toynbee would describe as "an abandon (ακρατεια)...a state of mind in which antinomianism is accepted – consciously or unconsciously, in theory or in practice – as a substitute for creativeness".

A peak of such acrasia was perhaps reached in the 1960s cult of letting it all hang out – of breakdown, acting out and emotional self-indulgence and drama. Partly in reaction, the proponents of emotional intelligence would look back to Aristotle in the search for impulse control and delayed gratification – to his dictum that "a person is called continent or incontinent according as his reason is or is not in control".

Incontinence ("a want of continence or self-restraint") is often used to translate the Greek term.

See also

Notes

References

Further reading
Dahl, N.O. 1984. Practical Reason, Aristotle, and the Weakness of Will. Minneapolis: University of Minnesota Press.
Wedin, M. 1988. Mind and Imagination in Aristotle. New Haven: Yale University Press.

External links 

 "Akrasia" by Seth J. Chandler, The Wolfram Demonstrations Project, 2007: An interactive computer model of akrasia based on 
 Akrasia and Self-Binding.
 Daniel Wegner's site containing links to papers on conscious will and on thought suppression.
Aristotle: Ethics and the Virtues (Weakness of the Will)
Aristotle: Nicomachean Ethics, Book VII

Greek words and phrases
Reasoning
Free will
Concepts in ethics
Motivation